Robert A. Irving (15 February 1948 – 18 April 1999) was an English World Cup winning professional rugby league footballer who played in the 1960s and 1970s. A Great Britain and England international, and Yorkshire representative , he played at club level for Oldham (Heritage № 672), Wigan (Heritage № 705), Salford, Barrow, Blackpool Borough and Swinton during the era of contested scrums.

Background
Bob irving was born in Castle Hill, Huddersfield, West Riding of Yorkshire, England, he was a hotelier in Blackpool, and studied for a degree, becoming a senior lecturer in business studies at Blackpool and The Fylde College. He was active in the Catholic Church, and undertook charity work in his spare time, regularly manning a soup kitchen for homeless and displaced people, and he died aged 51, following a heart attack in Blackpool, Lancashire, England.

Playing career
Irving was transferred, aged 16, from St. Joseph's ARLFC (in Huddersfield) to Oldham, and within a few weeks, he was playing in the first team.

International honours
Irving won caps for England while at Wigan in the 1975 Rugby League World Cup against Wales, France, and Australia, and won caps for Great Britain while at Oldham in 1967 against France (2 matches), and Australia (3 matches), in 1970 against Australia (sub), and New Zealand, in 1971 against New Zealand, in 1972 against France (sub), and in the 1972 Rugby League World Cup against New Zealand, and Australia (sub).

County Cup Final appearances
Bob Irving played right-, i.e. number 12, in Oldham's 13–16 defeat by Wigan in the 1966–67 Lancashire County Cup Final during the 1966–67 season at Station Road, Swinton on Saturday 29 October 1966, and played left-, i.e. number 11, in the 2–30 defeat by St. Helens in the 1968–69 Lancashire County Cup Final during the 1968–69 season at Central Park, Wigan on Friday 25 October 1968, played left-, i.e. number 11, in Wigan's 19–9 victory over Salford in the 1973–74 Lancashire County Cup Final during the 1973–74 season at Wilderspool Stadium, Warrington on Saturday 13 October 1973, and played right-, i.e. number 10, in the 13–16 defeat by Workington Town in the 1977–78 Lancashire County Cup Final during the 1977–78 season at Wilderspool Stadium, Warrington on Saturday 29 October 1977.

Honoured at Oldham
Robert Irving is an Oldham Hall of Fame Inductee.

Note
The "Tracking down the heroes of 1972" reference misstates his year of death as 2002, it was 1999. The "Obituary: Bob Irving at independent.co.uk" reference misstates his month of birth as December, it was February.

References

External links
When Great Britain won the World Cup
Statistics at wigan.rlfans.com
Tracking down the heroes of 1972
Oldham Hall of Fame
Statistics at orl-heritagetrust.org.uk
Obituary: Bob Irving at independent.co.uk

1948 births
1999 deaths
Barrow Raiders players
Blackpool Borough players
England national rugby league team players
English rugby league players
Great Britain national rugby league team players
Oldham R.L.F.C. players
Rugby league players from Huddersfield
Rugby league second-rows
Salford Red Devils players
Swinton Lions players
Wigan Warriors players
Yorkshire rugby league team players